Kazala Nowa  (1940-1945 German: Neukasala) is a settlement in the administrative district of Gmina Mycielin, within Kalisz County, Greater Poland Voivodeship, in west-central Poland.

The settlement has a population of 30.

References

Kazala Nowa